Joseph Haydn's Symphony No. 14 in A major, Hoboken I/14, may have been written between 1761 and 1763.

Symphony No. 14 is scored for 2 oboes, bassoon, 2 horns, strings and continuo. As was becoming more common for Haydn, this symphony has four movements:

Allegro molto, 
Andante in D major, 
Menuetto e Trio: Allegretto, with the Trio in A minor, both 
Allegro, 

The Andante was originally the finale of an early divertimento "Der Geburtstag" (en. "Birthday"), Hob. II/11. The variations of the divertimento are reworked into sonata form for the symphony.

The trio of the Minuet features an oboe solo accompanied by violins and cello.

The finale is highly contrapuntal and is based on a descending scale.

References

Symphony 014
Compositions in A major